The Old Tsan Yuk Maternity Hospital is located at No. 36A Western Street, Sai Ying Pun, Hong Kong. It was founded in 1922 under the Chinese Public Dispensary Committee. After the war, Tsan Yuk Hospital has moved to Hospital Road and the site has become a multi-purpose community centre called Western District Community Centre.

History
Tsan Yuk Hospital was originally located at the cross-section of Western Street and Third Street in Hong Kong's Sai Ying Pun district. The land on which the hospital was built was donated by the government and the $94,000 construction fee was donated by Mr. H. M. H Nemazee, Sai Ying Pun Kai Fong Committee of the Fishmongers' Guild and Fruit and Vegetable Sellers' Guild. The thirty beds were donated by Tung Wah Hospital, another government hospital located in neighbouring Sheung Wan.

The hospital was opened by the English missionary group London Missionary Society on 17 October 1922. It was originally opened as a maternity hospital, with the intention to meet society's increasing demand for neonatal services, including the training of midwives and obstetricians. The London Missionary Society recruited the first foreign female doctor in Hong Kong, Dr. Alice D. Hickling, and appointed her as the director of Tsan Yuk. In her development of obstetric services, she quickly recognized the abundance of women eager to become professional midwives in Hong Kong, and had the notion to provide such training through the hospital. She suggested this to Dr. S.W. Tso, Chairman of the Chinese Public Dispensary Committee, and he supported her proposal. Thus forward, Tsan Yuk became one of Hong Kong's foremost maternity teaching hospitals.

Tsan Yuk Hospital was closed in 1944, during the Japanese occupation of Hong Kong, and most of the furniture and equipment was moved to Pamela Youde Nethersole Eastern Hospital.

By the early 1950s, Tsan Yuk was experiencing bed shortages and limited places for patients. The Hong Kong Jockey Club donated $3,570,000 to build a new hospital on nearby Hospital Road. On 13 June 1955, Sir Alexander William George Herder Grantham held the opening ceremony for the new Tsan Yuk Hospital. Following the move, the premises were then used to house the Western District Community Centre.

Current use
The Community Centre consists of activity rooms, exhibition rooms and lecture theatres. They are commonly used by the following organizations:
 The Hong Kong Committee on Children's Rights 
 Sai Ying Pun Kai-fong Welfare Association
 Central & Western District Committee on Promotion of IT 
 Hong Kong Breastfeeding Mothers' Association 
 The Conservancy Association Centre for Heritage 
 Yan Chai hospital Chinese Medicine Clinic 
 Scout Association of Hong Kong, Western District, Hong Kong Island Region 
 Tung Sin Tan 
 Yuen Yuen VLearn Women Centre 
 St James' Settlement Urban Renewal Social Service Team

Conservation
On 18 September 2009, the building was classified as a Grade III historic building. This means it has been deemed of some significant merit by the Hong Kong Antiquities and Monuments Office, but does not yet qualify for consideration as a monument. It is also one of the 25 sites along the Section A of the "Western District and the Peak Route" of the Central and Western Heritage Trail.

The Conservancy Association Centre for Heritage
In 2007 The Conservancy Association, a Hong Kong-based NGO dedicated to protecting the environment and conserving cultural heritage, received a donation of HK$7.9 million from the Hong Kong Jockey Club.
This money was put towards a renovation project at the former Tsan Yuk Hospital, now the Centre for Heritage, as well as for the launching of a three-year community engagement and education programme advocating the importance of cultural heritage conservation in Hong Kong.

The renovation occurred over a three-month period in 2008, and included the construction of a multi-purpose hall for exhibitions and public lectures and two activity rooms for holding functions that aim to raise public awareness on cultural and heritage conservation.

The community outreach component of the programme comprised a wide variety of activities geared towards enhancing recognition and appreciation of local culture amongst the community. Activities included workshops, seminars, exhibitions and guided tours, all of which embodied the theme of sustaining traditional practices in a modern world. Exhibitions in the past covered topics including the Western District community's culture, the architecture in the community and the life in grassroots community.
The Centre also collaborates closely with primary and secondary schools and educational institutes to organise activities and design curriculum that promotes an authentic cultural experience for younger generations so they may develop a sense of cultural belongingness.

References

External links

 Film Service Office, "Location Library". Available from http://www.fso-createhk.gov.hk/lib/locations_details.cfm?Photo_Num=00598 (last accessed on 16 October 2009).
 Antiquities and Monuments Office, "Heritage Trails". Available from https://web.archive.org/web/20140106072833/http://www.lcsd.gov.hk/CE/Museum/Monument/en/trails_west1.php?tid=16 (last accessed on 15 October 2009).

Maternity hospitals
Maternity in China
Sai Ying Pun
Grade I historic buildings in Hong Kong
Grade II historic buildings in Hong Kong
Hospitals in Hong Kong